Tapantí - Cerro de la Muerte Massif National Park,, is a National Park in the Central Conservation Area of Costa Rica located on the edge of the Talamanca Range, near Cartago.  It protects forests to the north of Chirripó National Park, and also contains part of the Orosí River. The area known as Cerro de la Muerte Massif was added to the park on January 14, 2000.

The southwest border of the protected area corresponds partially to the Route 2,  (South Inter-American Highway), the Los Quetzales National Park and Los Santos Forest Reserve are located the other side of this road.

Flora and fauna
These forests provide habitat for some 45 mammal species, including the Baird's tapir, kinkajou, white-faced capuchin monkey, paca, agouti, ocelot, and jaguarundi. The park's 400 bird species include sparrow hawks, resplendent quetzals, emerald toucanets, and violaceous trogons. There are 28 species of reptiles and amphibians, and a large insect population that includes the thysania agrippina, the largest moth on the American continent.

Three new species of Lepanthes orchids were discovered in the park in 2009 and is so far their only known habitat. All three species, L. graciosa, L. machogaffensis, and L. pelvis, are miniature orchids and neither is longer than 5 mm. They were discovered by a team from the Lankester Botanical Garden and the University of Costa Rica.

Ramsar site  
Part of the  Ramsar site is located within this protected area and shared with Chirripó National Park, Los Quetzales National Park, Macho River Forest Reserve, Vueltas Hill Biological Reserve and Los Santos Forest Reserve.

References

External links
 Tapantí National Park at Costa Rica National Parks

National parks of Costa Rica
Protected areas established in 1982
Geography of Cartago Province
Tourist attractions in Cartago Province
1982 establishments in Costa Rica